Zaječická hořká ("Zaječice's Bitter Water") is strongly mineralized natural bitter water from the village of Zaječice in the Ústí nad Labem Region of the Czech Republic.

Description
Zaječická hořká is known since the 16th century for its purgative and gentle laxative effects. It rises from a wells located in the vicinity of Zaječice, Korozluky and Sedlec (part of Korozluky). It ranks among strongly mineralized mineral waters of the Magnesium sulphate type; it is cool, hypertonic, slightly opalescent, yellowish, scent-free, with a strongly bitter flavour.

During the history of the area, bitter waters from Zaječice, (Seidschitz), Sedlec (Sedlitz), Korozluky (Kollosoruk) and Bylany (Püllna) were exported to the whole world as the equivalent of Epsom salt products.
Trademarks for different markets were: Zaječická hořká, Seidschitzcher bitter-wasser, Sedlitz bitterwasser, Sedlitz water, Püllna wasser, Pillnaer bitter wasser.

The salt obtained by evaporation were made into "Biliner digestive pastiles".
Thanks to the well known curative effects of Zaječická and Sedlická water, end of the 19th century spread "Sedlitz powder" name for a laxative powder, which, however, had nothing to do with "Biliner digestive pastiles". So-called "Sedlitz powder", produced in different laboratories, had different chemical composition and side effects.

History
Zaječická bitter water was from 17th century the House of Lobkowicz at the Spa Bílinská Kyselka in the nearby town Bilina. Water from wells was thickened by evaporation and then filled into glass bottles.

The first scientific description of the therapeutic effects of water comes from balneologists Josef von Löschner, Franz Ambrosius Reuss and August Emanuel von Reuss.

Gallery

References
Das Saidschützer Bitter-Wasser physikalisch, chemisch und medizinisch geschiedet. Franz Ambrosius Reuss
Die Wirkungen des Saidschitzer Bitterwassers, Josef Löschner

External links

History of Zaječická hořká on Bílinská Kyselka's company website (in Czech)

Mineral water
Bottled water brands
Czech drinks
Czech brands